Gonnehem is a commune in the Pas-de-Calais department in the Hauts-de-France region of France.

The trumpeter Marc Geujon was born in Gonneheim on 8 October 1974.

Geography 

Population

Places of interest
 The fifteenth-century chateau de Werppe.
 The manorhouse de Bron, dating from the fifteenth century.
 The church of St.Pierre, dating from the sixteenth century.
 The church at the hamlet of Busnettes.

See also
Communes of the Pas-de-Calais department

References

Communes of Pas-de-Calais